Thames Water Utilities Ltd, known as Thames Water, is a large private utility company responsible for the public water supply and waste water treatment in most of Greater London, Luton, the Thames Valley, Surrey, Gloucestershire, north Wiltshire, far west Kent, and some other parts of England; it has a considerable local monopoly. Thames Water is the UK's largest water and wastewater services company, and supplies  of drinking water per day, and treats  of wastewater per day. The area covered by Thames Water has a population of 15 million, that comprise 27% of the UK population.

Thames Water is responsible for a range of water management infrastructure projects including the Thames Water Ring Main around London; the Lee Tunnel; Europe's largest wastewater treatment works and the UK's first large-scale desalination plant, both at Beckton. Thames Water awarded Bazalgette Tunnel Ltd the contract to build the £4.2 billion London Tideway Tunnel Infrastructure proposals by Thames Water include the proposed reservoir at Abingdon, Oxfordshire, which would be the largest enclosed or bunded reservoir in the UK.

Thames Water is regulated under the Water Industry Act 1991 and is owned by Kemble Water Holdings Ltd, a consortium formed in late 2006 and formerly owned by Australian-based Macquarie Group's European Infrastructure Funds specifically for the purpose of purchasing Thames Water. Currently the largest shareholders are Canadian pensions group OMERS (23%), the Universities Superannuation Scheme, (19.7%)  BT Pension Scheme (13%), the Abu Dhabi Investment Authority (9.9%), the China Investment Corporation (8.7%) and the Kuwait Investment Authority (8.5%). The name of the company reflects its role providing water to the drainage basin of the River Thames and not the source of its water, which is taken from a range of rivers and boreholes.

In March 2017 a judge imposed a record fine of £20.3m on Thames Water after large leaks of untreated sewage, totalling 1.4bn litres, occurred over a number of years. Sarah Bentley joined Thames Water in 2020 as its new CEO.

History

Origins

Thames Water can trace its history back to the building of the New River, from 1609 to 1612, which channelled fresh water from Hertfordshire to the New River Head in Islington. The business of the New River was taken over by the New River Company, officially founded by royal charter in 1619, under the leadership of Edmund Colthurst and Hugh Myddelton. Although earlier water companies existed providing fresh water to London, the New River Company is the earliest direct ancestor of Thames Water today.

During the 1850s, Dr John Snow and William Farr's identification of the 1854 Broad Street cholera outbreak provided a stimulus to the better treatment of sewage. The Thames Conservancy was established in 1857 with unified control over water supply, drainage and navigation. The Great Stink occurred in 1858, and focused government and public opinion on cleaning up the Thames. Joseph Bazalgette's remediation of The Great Stink provided the company with much of London's present Victorian sewerage infrastructure and several listed buildings within its portfolio of sites.

In 1904 The New River Company and eight other water companies serving London were taken into public ownership under control of the newly founded Metropolitan Water Board, and in 1973 these responsibilities were transferred to the Thames Water Authority.

Privatisation and listing
In 1989, the responsibility for navigation, regulatory, river and channels management inherited from the Thames Conservancy, was transferred to the National Rivers Authority which later became part of the Environment Agency. The remainder of Thames Water Authority was privatised as Thames Water Utilities Limited. The company was listed on the London Stock Exchange and became a constituent of the FTSE 100 Index.

Following international expansion, Thames Water became the world's third largest water company in 1995.

Takeovers
Thames Water plc was acquired by the German utility company RWE in 2001. As well as its British operations, it continued as an international water treatment consultancy and acquired further overseas operations.

On 17 October 2006, following several years of criticism about failed leakage targets in the UK, RWE announced it would sell Thames Water for £8 billion to Kemble Water Holdings Ltd, a consortium led by the Australian Macquarie Group. In December 2006, the sale of Thames Water's British operation went ahead, with RWE keeping the overseas operations.

Under the new ownership, the company re-focused its efforts on improving its operational performance and in 2007 announced the largest-ever capital investment programme (£1 billion p.a.) of any UK water company.

In 2012 some of the company's stock was acquired by the BT Pension Scheme (13%), the Abu Dhabi Investment Authority (9.9%) and the China Investment Corporation (8.7%). Thames Water was a Tier Three sponsor of the 2012 Summer Olympics in London.

Recent years
In 2017, under the government's Open Water programme, and in common with all water and sewerage companies, Thames Water must provide entirely separate retail and wholesale operations for its commercial customers, working through a central market operator.

On 14 March 2017, Macquarie Group sold its remaining stake in Thames Water's holding company to OMERS and the Kuwait Investment Authority.

Financials

In 2021, the financial position of Thames Water can be characterised as follows: Thames Water generates annual revenues of around £2bn. From this revenue, it generates a profit before interest, taxes, depreciation and amortisation (EBITDA) of around £1bn (50%). Such high EBITDA margins are not uncommon for infrastructure businesses, given that they need to re-invest the majority of the EBITDA into the asset base to continue to be able to generate EBITDA. Thames Water has annual capital requirements for investments into its infrastructure of around £800m – £1bn. The cash generation of the operating business (before interest and taxes) is thus around £0m – £200m or 0% – 10% of revenues. 

The level of capital investment derives from depreciation of around £600m as well as a largely fully depreciated asset base (which means that the level of depreciation does not fully reflect the level of required investments as also some asset have to be invested into that have no annual depreciation anymore). This level of investment does not allow the company to grow or to introduce new technologies. The investment of £800m – £1bn is solely needed to maintain the operations in the status quo. When Thames Water therefore refers to an investment program of this magnitude, this really only means that they maintain the units in the state to be able to run their business. 

As a consequence of the various buyouts since 2007, Thames Water has piled up debt of around £13bn. Even for infrastructure businesses, the ratio of debt to EBITDA of around 13 is extremely high. The debt consists of a plethora of private and public bonds that are issued by various entities in the corporate structure and which have maturities up until 2060. The annual interest obligations of the debt stand at around £400m or around 40% of EBITDA. This means after capital investments, the business does not generate sufficient cash to fulfil its interest obligations. Since years therefore, Thames Water has continuously issued more bonds in order to be able to service its debt. Also, bonds that have reached their maturity were repaid by the proceeds from issuing new bonds.  

Thames Water states that no dividends to shareholders were paid in recent years. They did pay some dividends from the operating business to the holding companies – this was needed in order to be able to service debt at the holding level. While factually correct that no dividends to shareholders were paid, the payment of such dividends is most likely prohibited by the financing documents.

Performance

Every day, Thames Water abstracts / extracts, treats and supplies  of potable tap water from 100 water treatment works via 288 clean water pumping stations through  of managed water mains to 10 million customers (3.6 million properties) across London and the Thames Valley. It maintains 30 raw water reservoirs and 235 underground service reservoirs. As well as direct customers, Thames Water supplies bulk clean water to some inset companies. Other inset companies maintain their own independent means of supply.

Before 1 October 2016, it is obliged to adopt 5,000+ private sewage pumping stations to add to its current stock of 2530 managed sewage pumping stations  Again, Thames Water treats and disposes of bulk sewage on behalf of some inset companies.

Thames Water produces biosolid fertiliser as a by-product from the waste treatment, and supplies this to local farms.

It also recovers phosphates – an increasingly important source of a dwindling naturally occurring mineral.

, it recovered approximately 18 MW (156 GWh per year), or 12.5% of its total energy requirements from renewable electricity generated from biogas collected from the sewage. Further biogas capacity, the burning of 'fatbergs' removed from London's sewers and substantial solar farms have enabled the company to announce a 2015–16 target of generating 36 MW (318 GWh per annum) or 20% of its total energy requirements from renewable sources, a 2020 target of self-generating 33% of electricity needs, and a commitment to 100% renewable energy eventually.

Health and safety
In December 2014 Thames Water pleaded guilty to a charge under the Health and Safety at Work etc. Act 1974 after the death at work of one of its workers. It was fined £300,000 with £61,000 prosecution costs. The incident occurred at its Coppermills Water Treatment Works in Walthamstow, London E17 in April 2010 when an excavator reversed over and killed the worker in a slow sand filter. The prosecution followed an investigation by the Health and Safety Executive.

Leakage

2001–06 (RWE's ownership)
Thames Water was repeatedly criticised for the amount of water that leaked from its pipes by the industry regulator Ofwat and was fined for this.

The Consumer Council for Water, a customers' group, accused Thames Water of continuing to miss its targets for the preceding five years. In July 2006, instead of a fine which would have gone "to the exchequer", the company was required to spend an extra £150 million on repairs.

Since 2007 (Kemble's ownership)
Thames Water has hit its Ofwat-agreed annual leakage-reduction target for each of the ten years running from 2006 to 2016.

The company has achieved these reductions by:

The recent successes in meeting leakage targets have mitigated the earlier failures to meet targets. As a result, and in spite of a larger distribution network, Thames Water now leaks slightly less water than at privatisation in 1989, having reduced leakage from its  network of water pipes by more than a third since its 2004 peak to its current lowest-ever level.  and with an older network profile, Thames Water leaked 25.8% of supply, slightly less than Severn Trent at 27%.  Thames Water leaked 25.1% of supply.

In June 2018 regulators made Thames Water pay £65 million to customers among other problems because they failed to fix leaks.

Pollution
In the period 2005–13 Thames Water was the most heavily fined water company in the UK for pollution incidents, paying £842,500 for 87 events. In 2016, it paid the largest fine for a single pollution incident of £1 million. In March 2017, Thames Water was fined a record £20.3 million after it pumped nearly 1.5 billion litres of untreated sewage into the River Thames. The company also admitted other water pollution and offences in Buckinghamshire and Oxfordshire. In awarding the fine, Judge Francis Sheridan noted the company's "continual failure to report incidents" and "history of non-compliance", saying: "This is a shocking and disgraceful state of affairs. It should not be cheaper to offend than to take appropriate precautions. I have to make the fine sufficiently large that [Thames Water] get the message", adding that, "One has to get the message across to the shareholders that the environment is to be treasured and protected, and not poisoned.". What was "shocking and disgraceful" was not just the scale of the pollution, but that it was intentional. Sheridan added "the constant use of flow clipping to protect the treatment process, so that, despite the regular and prolonged discharge of untreated sewage to the River Thames via the storm outfalls, all samples taken at the final effluent outfall complied with the permit. This was deliberately done and gave a false impression of the sewage treatment works’ performance and undermined the operator's self-monitoring process."

Conversely, in 2014, Thames Water admitted that it had accidentally over-reported the number of properties at high risk of sewage flooding between 2005 and 2010. It agreed to a compensation package for customers of £86 million.

In 2022, a report published by the parliamentary Environmental Audit Select Committee on water quality in the UK's rivers showed that Thames Water's Mogden wastewater treatment works in Isleworth discharged a quantity of sewage which would fill 400 Olympic-sized swimming pools on 3 and 4 October 2020.

Other incidents

In September 2007,  of the River Wandle, Greater London was polluted. In January 2009, Thames Water pleaded guilty at Sutton Magistrates Court, and was subsequently fined £125,000 at Croydon Crown Court and ordered to pay £21,335 in clean-up and investigation costs. In February 2010, on appeal, the fine was found to be "manifestly excessive" and was reduced to £50,000.

Between 14 and 16 August 2011, Thames Water polluted the Faringdon Stream, in Faringdon, Oxfordshire. The company was fined £10,000 and ordered to pay costs of £4,488 

On 29 October 2011, Thames Water released thousands of tonnes of raw sewage into the River Crane in Greater London, killing thousands of fish, when a six-tonne valve jammed during routine maintenance. Despite tankering and alternative routing, the volume of sewage from Heathrow overwhelmed the operations. Thames Anglers Conservancy's Robin Vernon said: “It will take a decade to repair all the damage done by the sewage spill. Everything in there is just dead now.” In 2013, fungus and slime in the River Crane was attributed to runoff of de-icer from Heathrow getting into the river  In 2014, Thames Water blamed recent pollution on fat poured down drains by local customers.

On 9 December 2011, Thames Water was fined £60,000 after releasing sewage sludge into the Foudry Brook killing up to 20,000 fish in a three-mile stretch from Silchester, Hampshire.

In September 2012, clogged-up pumps caused sewage to be released into the Chase Brook, near Newbury. A £250,000 fine imposed in August 2014 was adjudged "lenient" on appeal in 2015. The pumps were replaced by improved pumps.

In January 2016, Thames Water was fined a record £1m for polluting the Grand Union Canal in Hertfordshire between July 2012 and April 2013. In addition, it was required to pay costs of £18,000 and a victim surcharge of £120. In its defence, Thames Water said it had spent £30,000 replacing equipment at Tring.

On Christmas Day 2016, the Thames Water Hampton pump failed and as a consequence, thousands of Londoners in the TW and W postcode areas were left without water.

In December 2018, Thames Water was fined £2m for polluting two brooks near Milton-under-Wychwood in Oxfordshire. On 8 and 9 August 2015, raw sewage was discharged into the water, killing 150 fish. It was also forced to pay legal costs of £79,991.57.

In July 2019, Thames Water was fined £607,000 for polluting the Maidenhead Ditch and the River Cut in Berkshire. In June 2014, raw sewage and treated sewage was discharged into the Maidenhead Ditch. Thames Water has a licence to discharge sewage into the watercourse in storm conditions. However, in June 2014 there were no extreme weather events which would allow the company to discharge untreated sewage. The company also did not meet the conditions which would allow it to discharge treated sewage. Another incident of sewage discharge occurred on 7 August 2014. The company was also ordered to pay costs of £100,000.

In February 2021, Thames Water was fined £2.3m for a pollution incident in 2016 that caused the death of 1,200 fish. Untreated sewage with a high ammonia content was discharged into the Fawley Court ditch and stream that flows into the River Thames at Henley-on-Thames. The incident occurred between 21 and 24 April 2016. The incident was caused by a lack of adequate monitoring in place at the Henley treatment works, as well as faulty equipment.  Judge Francis Sheridan stated that the pollution and the preceding events showed 'high negligence' on the part of the company. The company was also ordered to pay costs of £87,944

In May 2021, Thames Water was fined £4m for a number of pollution incidents which took place between 2016 and 2019 in the Kingston Area. One of these incidents involved the company allowing approximately 79 million litres of untreated sewage to escape from a manhole cover into Green Lane Recreation Ground, New Malden, a nearby woodland, and the Hogsmill River. Equipment at Thames Water's Hogsmill Treatment Works was unable to withstand the effects of Storm Imogen, and the pumps failed. It took fifteen hours for Thames Water to report the incident to the Environment Agency, as it is legally obliged to do. The company was also ordered to pay costs of £84,669.

Local planning
In 2011, the company found itself involved in a controversial redevelopment plan for the Bath Road Reservoir in its home town of Reading. An appeal against Reading Borough Council's rejection of the plan was dismissed by the planning inspector in January 2011. Full planning permission was subsequently granted on 10 December 2012.

Flooding
The exceptional rain and weather conditions of 2013–14 caused swollen rivers and several low-lying Thames Water treatment works to be submerged under flood water.

In February 2014, the River Ash caused flooding in homes in Staines-upon-Thames. This flooding was exacerbated by a two-day delay by Surrey County Council's 'Gold Control' flood control group in ordering Thames Water to close a sluice gate on a Thames Water aqueduct. Thames Water considered it had been following an existing protocol agreed with Surrey County Council and the Environment Agency.

Sheep
Thames Water maintains commercial flocks of sheep on the borders of several of its reservoirs, which are used as the cheapest way to stop large plants growing and damaging the banks.

Thames Tideway scheme

Over centuries of London's growth from medieval times to the Victorian age, the natural tributary system of the Thames Tideway was converted first into public open sewers and then closed over into covered sewers which emptied directly into the River Thames. Joseph Bazalgette's remediation of the ensuing 1850s Great Stink renewed much of London's sewerage mains infrastructure during the period 1859 to 1865. However, the new design was not intended to cope with the doubling of London's population over the following 150 years. The concreting of huge amounts of London's green spaces causes substantial rainwater run-off into the drainage and sewerage systems which had been expected to soak into the ground. As a result, even small amounts of rainfall in certain circumstances can cause London's outdated Victorian sewerage system to fail over, and release untreated sewage mixed with rainwater directly into the Thames Tideway.

The released effluent follows the ebb and flow of the tidal Thames, and can take up to 3 days to exit the Tideway into the Estuary. For this reason, Thames Water advises against swimming in the Thames Tideway and, by extension, walking in the tidal strand area. Despite this pollution, large marine mammals are increasingly found in the Thames Tideway and Estuary, indicating some level of year-on-year improvement 

To mitigate and resolve the above problems, the Thames Tideway Scheme proposed a three-stage series of improvements. The first two stages of the improvements were upgrades to 5 sewage treatment works and construction of the  Lee Tunnel, formally opened on 28 January 2016. Together, these are expected to result in an annual discharge reduction of 40%. The third stage is the  Thames Tideway Tunnel, which was proposed by the Thames Tideway Strategic Study, including Thames Water, as an effective solution to deal with most of the remaining problem. On 12 September 2014, planning consent was formally approved by the UK Government. On 24 August 2015, the building contracts were awarded for the western section (Ealing to Hammersmith: £416 million, to BAM Nuttall, Morgan Sindall and Balfour Beatty), the central section (Hammersmith to Tower Bridge: £746 million, to Ferrovial Agroman and Laing O'Rourke) and the eastern section (Tower Bridge to Stratford and Greenwich: £605 million, to Costain, Vinci Construction Grands Projets and Bachy Soletanche). On 3 November 2015, Bazalgette Tunnel Ltd received its operating licence from OFWAT, ensuring the start of the project.

The necessity for action has added urgency because of imminent water quality fines of up to £1bn by the European Commission on the UK Government.

References

External links 

 

 
Companies based in Reading, Berkshire
London water infrastructure
Water companies of England
Utilities of the United Kingdom
Former nationalised industries of the United Kingdom
Organizations established in 1973
Organizations disestablished in 1989
Companies established in 1989
Companies formerly listed on the London Stock Exchange
Geography of the River Thames
 
1973 establishments in England
Companies supplying water and sanitation to London